Helena Sofi Lindahl, (born 1 July 1972) is a Swedish politician of the Centre Party who has been a member of the Riksdagen since 2010.

Political career 
Since 2010, Lindahl has been a member of the Swedish Parliament, first as minister-replacement, then as a full member after Maud Olofsson had resigned as party leader and MP. She represents the Västerbottens district. In parliament, she is a member of the Committee on Industry and an alternate member of the Committee on the Environment and Agriculture.

Political positions 
In 2019, Lindahl voted against the party line and came out against Stefan Löfven’s candidacy as Prime Minister of Sweden in a vote he ultimately won; she was the only Center Party lawmaker to vote against him. When the same vote came up again in 2021, she said that she would follow the party's official line, and later voted for Löfven to continue as Prime Minister. She also voted in favor of approving Löfven's chosen successor, Magdalena Andersson.

References

External links 

Living people
1972 births
Members of the Riksdag from the Centre Party (Sweden)
Members of the Riksdag 2010–2014
Members of the Riksdag 2014–2018
Members of the Riksdag 2018–2022
Women members of the Riksdag
Members of the Riksdag 2022–2026
21st-century Swedish women politicians